Elton Junior Melo Ataíde (born 17 March 1990 in Teodoro Sampaio, São Paulo), simply known as Elton, is a Brazilian footballer who plays as a defensive midfielder for Juventude, on loan from Bahia.

Career statistics

References

External links

1990 births
Living people
Brazilian footballers
Association football midfielders
Campeonato Brasileiro Série A players
Campeonato Brasileiro Série B players
Sport Club Internacional players
Criciúma Esporte Clube players
Paraná Clube players
Associação Atlética Ponte Preta players
Esporte Clube Bahia players
Esporte Clube Juventude players